US Airways, Inc. v. Barnett, (2002), was a United States Supreme Court case in which the Court held that even requests for accommodation that might seem reasonable on their face, e.g., a transfer to a different position, can be rendered unreasonable because it would require a violation of the company's seniority system.  This case involved the Americans with Disabilities Act of 1990. While the court held that, in general, a violation of a seniority system renders an otherwise reasonable accommodation unreasonable, a plaintiff can present evidence that, despite the seniority system, the accommodation is reasonable in the specific case at hand, e.g., the plaintiff could offer evidence that the seniority system is so often disregarded that another exception wouldn't make a difference.

Importantly, the court held that the defendant need not provide proof that this particular application of the seniority system should prevail, and that, once the defendant showed that the accommodation violated the seniority system, it fell to Barnett to show it was nevertheless reasonable.

In this case, Robert Barnett was a US Airways employee who injured his back, rendering him physically unable to perform his cargo-handling job. Invoking seniority, he transferred to a less-demanding mailroom job, but this position later became open to seniority-based bidding and was bid on by more senior employees. Barnett requested the accommodation of being allowed to stay on in the less-demanding mailroom job. US Airways denied his request, and he lost his job.

The Supreme Court decision invalidated both the approach of the district court, which found that the mere presence and importance of the seniority system was enough to warrant a summary judgment in favor of US Airways, as well as the circuit court's approach that interpreted 'reasonable accommodation' as 'effective accommodation.'

References 

2002 in United States case law
United States disability case law
United States Supreme Court cases